Dyspessa pallida is a species of moth of the family Cossidae. It is found in Uzbekistan and Tajikistan.

References

Moths described in 1912
Dyspessa
Moths of Asia